Sauternes is a commune in the Gironde department in Nouvelle-Aquitaine in southwestern France.

It is also a wine region within the Graves portion of Bordeaux that produces sweet white dessert wines, named "Sauternes" after the commune, as well as some dry white wine.

Population

See also
Sauternes (wine)
Bordeaux wine regions
Communes of the Gironde department

References

Communes of Gironde
Dessert wine